The Kansas Aviation Museum is a museum located in Wichita, Kansas, United States, near 31st South and George Washington Blvd.  The building was the former Wichita Municipal Airport terminal from 1935 to 1954.

The Museum features many display aircraft including the WB-47E Stratojet, B-52D Stratofortress, KC-135 Stratotanker, Boeing 727, Boeing 737-2H4, Republic F-84F Thunderstreak, Beech Starship, Cessna T-37, Learjet 23, Cessna 500/501 Prototype, Stearman 4D, Texico 11, Stearman Trainer, 1920 Laird Swallow, 1926 Swallow, 1930 Watkins Skylark SL, 1944 Beech Staggerwing, U-8 Seminole, and Lockheed T-33.

The building was listed on the National Register of Historic Places as the Administration Building in 1990. It has also been known as Building One.

History and Architecture
Source: * Kansas Aviation Museum
The Kansas Aviation Museum is in the Terminal and Administration building of the former Wichita Municipal Airport in Wichita. The building and landing area are constructed on ground that had never been plowed and was known as the California section. The Park Board purchased  in 1928 and, with Glen Thomas as architect, started the building on July 1, 1930, but construction soon halted due to the Great Depression and lack of funds. The building sat uncompleted until 1933 when construction resumed as a WPA project. The opening dedication ceremony took place on Sunday March 31, 1935. The runways were paved in the late 1930s as a WPA project.

Wichita was the last stop before crossing the Rocky Mountains to Denver or Los Angeles in those days. The airport was greatly needed for fuel and more importantly weather updates. As told in story after story, many people who landed, ate at the restaurant and milled about were legends of industry and film. Fred Astaire, Bob Hope, Howard Hughes and countless other famous people all walked the terrazzo floors in what is now the Kansas Aviation Museum. It was tagged the "Country Club without dues". During the oppressive heat of the 1930s people would come out to the airport at night, spread out a blanket, enjoy the cool breezes and watch the incoming and outgoing aircraft. The building and its grounds sit about  higher than downtown and always has a breeze blowing.

During World War II the airport became the fourth busiest in the United States being a convenient stop off in the middle of the US and with the endless flight testing of tens of thousands of aircraft being built in Wichita for the War effort. The additions on the east and west end of the building were added in 1942 and 1943. The upper part of the control tower was added in 1940. It was the first control tower to have slanted windows.

After WWII and into the 1950s, the U.S. Air Force decided they needed an air base in centrally located Kansas which would later become McConnell Air Force Base, a Strategic Air Command base until mid-1992 when it became an Air Combat Command base, and December 1993 when it became an Air Mobility Command base. The Air Force didn't want to spend years designing and building a new air base; they wanted one now.

The Air Force and the City of Wichita came to an agreement on price and the building was sold to the Federal Government in 1951. The city bought land, designed and began construction of the new Wichita Municipal airport on the west side of Wichita. Both civil and military flights shared the airport until October 1954 when the last commercial flight took off. The Air Force continued to use the building (called Building One) until about 1984 when they shut the doors and abandoned it marking it off as surplus. It sat empty and partially gutted for at least six years until the Kansas Aviation Museum was formed in 1990 and began work. An application for the building to be placed on the Historic Register was filed on March 6, 1990 and was later approved. The outside of the building has been restored but still needs some work. The south part of the building now looks very close to how it looked in 1935.

Much remains to be done to the inside and millions more will have to be spent to bring it back to its 1930's heyday look. The building is without a doubt one of the most beautiful buildings in Wichita and possibly in Kansas. As of June 2012, efforts to update the museum have stagnated due to lack of funding. In 2019, improvements were made to the museum, new exterior doors were installed. The control tower glass was replaced. Both projects were done to improve the functionality of the building while  maintaining the historical standards required by the National Historical Registry.

The architecture of the building is art deco with its strong and obvious geometric shapes and sharp angles. At the front above the triple doors to the lobby is the famous Bas-relief of the Spirit of St.Louis crossing the Atlantic with Ireland in sight. A bas-relief sculpture is raised or sunken and not a flat piece of artwork. Carthalite was used to for the bas-relief to provide longevity and maintain the color vitality. Carthalite is  white portland cement concrete with colored glass aggregates.

The Kansas Aviation Museum is one of only a few museums that allow visitors to enter its exhibition aircraft. The museum operates a once yearly "Play on a Plane Day".

Gallery

See also

 Cosmosphere in Hutchinson
 Combat Air Museum in Topeka
 Mid-America Air Museum in Liberal
 Kansas World War II army airfields
 List of aerospace museums
 List of museums in Kansas

References

External links

 
 Wings Over Kansas: Aviation Hall of Fame Inductees 1986–1999 List
 Administrative Building from the National Park Service site Aviation: From Sand Dunes to Sonic Booms: A National Register of Historic Places Travel Itinerary
 [ Administrative Building NRHP Application (12 page PDF)] - National Park Service

Aerospace museums in Kansas
Museums in Wichita, Kansas
Military and war museums in Kansas
Art Deco airports
Art Deco architecture in Kansas
National Register of Historic Places in Wichita, Kansas
Air transportation buildings and structures on the National Register of Historic Places
Military facilities on the National Register of Historic Places in Kansas